Husna Parvin Ahmad, OBE (born 28 June 1964) is a British humanitarian and writer. She is secretary-general of the World Muslim Leadership Forum. She was the chief executive officer of the Faith Regen Foundation.

Early life
Dr. Husna Ahmad was born in Dhaka, East Pakistan (now Bangladesh) and moved to the United Kingdom at the age of four. She has a PhD in International Environmental Law from the School of Oriental and African Studies, University of London.

Career
From June 2006 to March 2013, Dr. Husna Ahmad was CEO of Faith Regen Foundation. She was a member of Faith Regen Foundation's staff since its inception in October 2001 and has previously held the position of director of operations.

Dr. Husna Ahmad sat on the advisory board of the East London Mosque. She held the role of deputy chief executive of the Forum against Islamophobia and Racism and was a principal officer in the Royal Borough of Kensington and Chelsea. She previously sat on the Department for Work and Pensions' Ethnic Minority Advisory Group (EMAG). She also sat on the Community Development Forum of the London Health Commission. She was the co-chair of the National Council of Faiths and Beliefs in Further Education.

In March 2005, Dr. Husna Ahmad was on the judging panel for The Muslim News Awards for Excellence. In 2008, she was a member of a Ministerial Working Group on Child Poverty in London.

In November, 2009, Dr. Husna Ahmad was invited to join a UK Muslim Women Delegation to the Grand Mosque in Kuwait. Also in 2009, she was invited by the Foreign & Commonwealth Office to join a British Muslims delegation to Iran.

In 2011, she co-authored The Green Guide For Hajj, with EcoMuslim consultant Omar Faruk, the book encourages ecologically sustainable practices among Hajj pilgrims and promotes the role Muslims can play in protecting nature. In 2012, she wrote Islam and Water, the story of Hajjar second wife of the Islamic prophet Ibrahim, in particular her search for water, which is commemorated every year in the Hajj. Both books were commissioned by the Alliance of Religions and Conservation.

Between 2012 and 2015, Dr. Husna Ahmad was a National Council member for the Royal National Lifeboat Institute, a charity saving lives at sea in the UK and Republic of Ireland. From 2012, she also held the position of Islamic Advisor to the Alliance of Religions and Conservation.

From 2015 to 2022 she was a Board Member for Faith in Water. In 2015, Dr. Husna Ahmad also became a Board Member for the Global Interfaith WASH Alliance.

In 2016, Dr. Husna Ahmad became a Board Member for BOND, a UK network for organisations working in international development. This was a position that she held until 2019. Between 2016-2019, Dr. Husna Ahmad also acted as an International Advisory Board Member to the Commonwealth initiative on Freedom of Religion or Belief.

In 2019, Dr. Husna Ahmad undertook her role as Co-Chair of the Multi Faith Advisory Council to the UN Taskforce on Religion and Development, a position that she held until 2021. She remains a member of the Multi Faith Advisory Council.

In 2022, Dr. Husna Ahmad was invited to join working group 17 of The Rockefeller Foundation and Brookings Institutes’ annual “17 Rooms” global flagship process. 

Dr. Husna Ahmad continues to hold a number of positions, including Secretary General of the World Muslim Leadership Forum and Board Member MCEC Palmers Green Mosque. In 2022, she was invited to become a member of the Interfaith Women’s Council of Faith for Earth, UN Environment Programme. Dr. Husna Ahmad is also an Honorary Fellow of the Edward Cadbury Centre at Birmingham University, UK.

The Alliance of NGOs and CSOs for South-South Cooperation

Dr. Husna Ahmad is Global Coordinator for the Alliance of NGOs and CSOs for South-South Cooperation (ANCSSC). Launched in November 2018, the ANCSSC works in collaboration with the United Nations Office for South-South Cooperation (UNOSSC), to enhance civil society’s understanding of the value of South-South Cooperation in developmental, humanitarian and related spheres. The ANCSSC encourages the sharing of knowledge, expertise and contextually appropriate technologies and assets among NGOs and CSOs, particularly those that have been developed in their respective organisational and operational experiences in developing countries.

In her capacity as Global Coordinator, Dr. Husna Ahmad has convened numerous events. These include a hybrid side-event at the Global South-South Development Expo in Bangkok, Thailand.  Held on 14th September, 2022, the event was entitled Exploring the nexus between civil society, government, and the private sector in promoting economic inclusion, digitalization, and education. 

Under the ANCSSC, Dr. Husna Ahmad also held a hybrid parallel event at the United Nations High-Level Political Forum (HPLF) on Sustainable Development. Convened in collaboration with Act Alliance on 8th July, 2022, the event was hosted by Deloitte in New York, USA, under the title Reimagining our world together: Building Global South multi-stakeholder partnerships for an inclusive COVID-19 recovery.

During MENA Climate Week held in the UAE on 31st March, 2022, Dr. Husna Ahmad convened a side-event, in collaboration with United Cities and Local Governments of Africa at the Dubai Exhibition Centre. The side-event was entitled Local government and civil society working towards an integrated approach to building resilience and inclusion by accelerating adaptation in the MENA region and African countries.

Speaking engagements

Awards and recognition
In 2004, Dr. Husna Ahmad won the Organisation Ethnic award from the European Federation of Black Women Business Owners. The awards are open to black and minority ethnic women who start or run a business.

In April 2010, she received an Ambassador for Peace award from the Universal Peace Federation. In 2010, she was also appointed an Officer of the Order of the British Empire (OBE) in the 2010 New Year Honours for her services to disadvantaged people for work promoting social justice with disadvantaged communities.

Personal life
Dr. Husna Ahmad lives in New Southgate, London with her husband, Saif Uddin Ahmad, who was CEO of Al-Khair Foundation and founder of MADE in Europe. She has six children (born between 1983 and 2005).

Books

See also
 British Bangladeshi
 List of British Bangladeshis

References

External links
 
 Faith Regen Foundation website
 Ahmad, Husna. The Green Guide For Hajj.
 Ahmad, Husna. Islam and Water, The Hajjar (r.a.) Story and Guide. Global One. 2011
 Women’s Role in Peaceful Coexistence: Tackling violent extremism and promoting community cohesion. Faith Regen Foundation. p. 51
 Webster, George. Holy cities face threat from polluting pilgrims. CNN. 9 November 2011

1964 births
Living people
Bangladeshi Muslims
British Muslims
Bangladeshi emigrants to England
British people of Bangladeshi descent
Naturalised citizens of the United Kingdom
British humanitarians
British chief executives
Bangladeshi women writers
Muslim writers
British non-fiction writers
British Asian writers
21st-century British women writers
People from Dhaka
People from Cricklewood
Alumni of SOAS University of London
Officers of the Order of the British Empire
20th-century Bengalis
21st-century Bengalis